Club Deportivo Ourense B, S.A.D. was a football team based in Ourense in the autonomous community of Galicia. They were the reserve team of CD Ourense. Founded in 1952, the team last played in Preferente Autonómica. The club's home ground was Estadio Os Remedios.

CD Ourense and Ourense B were dissolved in 2014.

Season to season

16 seasons in Tercera División

External links
Official website 
Unofficial website
Unofficial website

Football clubs in Galicia (Spain)
Association football clubs established in 1952
Spanish reserve football teams
1952 establishments in Spain
Association football clubs disestablished in 2014
Defunct football clubs in Galicia